Talena A. L. Atfield (born January 14, 1983) is a Canadian bass player, best known as a former member of the heavy metal group Kittie.

Musical career

Kittie
Atfield had just about given up on playing in a band when she received a phone call from Mercedes Lander. Atfield was asked to take the place in local band Kittie as their bassist Tanya Candler had just left for "personal reasons". Talena had been a supporter of Kittie and was happy to join them so she learned how to play bass guitar in two weeks to go out to New York to film the video for "Brackish".

In 1999, Atfield joined Kittie to replace Tanya Candler on bass guitar. Although she did not play on Spit, the first studio album by Kittie, the cover art on later pressings was changed to represent her presence in the band. She performed on their second album and the band's accompanying live appearances. In 2002, Talena Atfield left and was replaced on bass guitar by Jennifer Arroyo.

After Kittie
Atfield was also a member of Fallon Bowman's Amphibious Assault industrial music project.

Atfield served on a judging panel for America's Hot Musician, a reality talent competition for instrumental musicians, alongside Duke Ellington Orchestra alumnus Gregory Charles Royal and National Symphony Orchestra violinist Marissa Regni.  The show was to air on the Oxygen Network in July 2007.  An attorney representing the current incarnation of Kittie served American Youth Symphony (producers of America's Hot Musician) a cease-and-desist letter for their use of clips from the band's video "What I Always Wanted" in the opening sequence of the show.

References

External links
 

1983 births
Living people
Place of birth missing (living people)
Canadian heavy metal bass guitarists
Canadian rock bass guitarists
Canadian women guitarists
Women bass guitarists
Musicians from Ontario
20th-century Canadian bass guitarists
21st-century Canadian bass guitarists
20th-century Canadian guitarists
21st-century Canadian guitarists
20th-century Canadian women musicians
21st-century Canadian women musicians
Kittie members
First Nations musicians
Canadian Mohawk people
Women in metal
20th-century women guitarists
21st-century women guitarists